Maa Kasam may refer to the following Indian movies:
 Maa Kasam (1985 film): a Hindi film directed by Shibu Mittra
 Maa Kasam (1999 film): a Hindi film directed by Ashok Gaitwak
 Maa Kasam (2005 film): Hindi dub of the Kannada movie Kaashi